Serbia competed at the 2016 European Athletics Championships, which were held in Amsterdam, Netherlands from 6-10 July 2016.

Results

Men
Track & road events

Field Events

Combined events – Decathlon

Women

Track & road events

Field Events

References

European Athletics Championships
2016
Nations at the 2016 European Athletics Championships